The Mulberry Phosphate Museum is located in Mulberry in Polk County, Florida. Located in the city's original railroad depot, the museum was established in 1986.  Exhibitions include fossils, memorabilia and exhibits about the phosphate mining industry. In 2013 it added a recently discovered 1880s-vintage phosphate locomotive.

Gallery

References

External links

Fossil museums
History museums in Florida
Industry museums in Florida
Mulberry, Florida
Museums in Polk County, Florida
Natural history museums in Florida